An incel (a portmanteau of "involuntary celibate") is a member of an online subculture of people who define themselves as unable to get a romantic or sexual partner despite desiring one. Discussions in incel forums are often characterized by resentment and hatred, misogyny, misanthropy, self-pity and self-loathing, racism, a sense of entitlement to sex, and the endorsement of violence against women and sexually active people. The American Southern Poverty Law Center(SPLC) described the subculture as "part of the online male supremacist ecosystem" that is included in their list of hate groups. Incels are mostly male and heterosexual, and are often white. Estimates of the overall size of the subculture vary greatly, ranging from thousands to hundreds of thousands of individuals.

Since 2014, multiple mass killings have been perpetrated by self-identified incels, as well as other instances of violence or attempted violence. Incel communities have been increasingly criticized by scholars and commentators for their misogyny, the condoning and encouragement of violence, and extremism.

History 
The first website to use the term "incel" was founded during the 1990s, although media is conflicted on whether this occurred during 1993 or 1997. The website was founded by a university student living in Toronto known only by her first name, Alana. She created the website to discuss her sexual inactivity with others. Titled "Alana's Involuntary Celibacy Project", the website was used by people of all genders to share their thoughts and experiences. During 1997, she started a mailing list on the topic that used the abbreviation INVCEL, later shortened to "incel", for "anybody of any gender who was lonely, had never had sex or who hadn't had a relationship in a long time". During her college years and after, Alana realized she was bisexual and became more comfortable with her identity. She stopped participating in her online project around 2000 and gave the site to a stranger. In 2018, Alana said of her project: "It definitely wasn't a bunch of guys blaming women for their problems. That's a pretty sad version of this phenomenon that's happening today. Things have changed in the last 20 years". When she read about the 2014 Isla Vista killings, and that parts of the incel subculture glorified the perpetrator, she wrote: "Like a scientist who invented something that ended up being a weapon of war, I can't uninvent this word, nor restrict it to the nicer people who need it". She expressed regret at the change in usage from her original intent of creating an "inclusive community" for people of all genders who were sexually deprived due to social awkwardness, marginalization, or mental illness.

The message board love-shy.com was founded in 2003 as a place for people who felt perpetually rejected or were extremely shy with potential partners to discuss their situations. It was less strictly moderated than its counterpart, IncelSupport, which was also founded in the 2000s. While IncelSupport welcomed men and women and banned misogynistic posts, love-shy.com's userbase was overwhelmingly male. Over the next decade, the membership of love-shy.com and online fringe right-wing communities like 4chan increasingly overlapped. In the 2000s, incel communities became more extremist as they adopted behaviors common on forums like 4chan and Reddit, where extremist posts were encouraged as a way to achieve visibility. According to Bruce Hoffman and colleagues writing in Studies in Conflict & Terrorism, as "edgy" and extremist statements became more prevalent in incel communities, so too did extremist trolling and "shitposting".

The r/incels subreddit, a forum on the website Reddit, later became a particularly active incel community. It was known as a place where men blamed women for their inceldom, sometimes advocated for rape or other forms of violence, and were misogynistic and often racist. On October 25, 2017, Reddit announced a new policy that prohibited "content that encourages, glorifies, incites, or calls for violence or physical harm against an individual or a group of people", and on November 7, 2017, banned the /r/incels subreddit under the policy's purview. At the time of the ban, the community had around 40,000 members. The incel community continued to inhabit Reddit in other subreddits, such as on the subreddit /r/braincels. Although the tone of the subreddit was similar to /r/incels, moderators of the /r/braincels forum said that they did not endorse, support, or glorify violence or violent people, a distinction they made from the subject matter of its predecessor that resulted in its being banned from Reddit. The /r/braincels subreddit was banned later, however, on September 30, 2019, after Reddit again broadened its banning policy. Incel communities began to migrate away from shared platforms and instead use their own closed forums dedicated specifically to the subject. The largest of such forums was founded in 2017 and had 12,000 members as of March 2021. The UK-based Center for Countering Digital Hate (CCDH) published a report in September 2022 about the largest dedicated incel forum, based on monthly visits, and a network of other sites run by the same two pseudonymous individuals. The Washington Post, New York Times, and the CCDH identified the individuals as Uruguay-based Diego Joaquín Galante and United States-based Lamarcus Small.

Incels came to wider public notice throughout the 2010s with the banning of /r/incels and when a series of mass murders were committed by men who either identified as incels or shared similar ideologies. Increased interest in incel communities has been attributed to feelings of "aggrieved entitlement" among some men who feel they are being denied rights they deserve and blame women for their lack of sex.

During 2020, the streaming platform Twitch updated their policy on hateful conduct and harassment. The new Twitch policy included banning the use of the word 'incel' as an insult, highlighting how the term is often used to negatively refer to an individual's sexual activity.

M. Kelly writing for the Political Research Associates think tank in 2021 said that over the prior two years, some incels had attempted to "reframe and normalize their beliefs" by writing blog posts, and articles on subject-specific wikis and forums rejecting the more open expressions of misogyny by other incels, highlighting the heterogeneity of incel communities, and reframing incels not as an online subculture but as those experiencing a life circumstance that applies even to individuals who are not members of the subculture. Kelly also wrote that these attempts to redefine themselves contradicted the communities' self-identifications and moderation strategies, where members regularly challenge other users' "legitimacy" as incels, but have accepted as members individuals with sexual experience who nonetheless shared similar political ideologies.

Extremism 

Incel communities became more extremist and focused on violence from the late 2010s. This has been attributed to factors including influences from overlapping online hate groups and the rise of the alt-right and white supremacist groups. The misogynistic and violent rhetoric of some incels has led to numerous bans from websites and webhosts. Incel communities continue to exist on more lenient platforms including 4chan, 8chan, and Gab, as well as on web forums created specifically for the topic. More extremist incels have increasingly migrated to obscure locations including gaming chat services and the dark web to avoid site shutdowns and the self-censorship that has developed among some incel communities as an effort to avoid drawing scrutiny from law enforcement or website service providers.

Beginning in 2018 and into the 2020s, the incel ideology has been described by North American governments and researchers as a terrorism threat, and law enforcement have issued warnings about the subculture. In May 2019, an American man was sentenced to up to five years in prison for attempting to make terrorist threats, posting on social media, "I'm planning on shooting up a public place... killing as many girls as I see". In September 2019, the U.S. Army warned soldiers about the possibility of violence at movie theaters showing the Joker film, after "disturbing and very specific chatter" was found in conversations among incels on the dark web. A January 2020 report by the Texas Department of Public Safety warned that incels were an "emerging domestic terrorism threat" that "could soon match, or potentially eclipse, the level of lethalness demonstrated by other domestic terrorism types". A 2020 paper published by Bruce Hoffman and colleagues in Studies in Conflict & Terrorism concluded that "the violent manifestations of the ideology pose a new terrorism threat, which should not be dismissed or ignored by domestic law enforcement agencies". Dr. John Horgan, a psychology professor at Georgia State University who in 2019 received a $250,000 grant from the U.S. Department of Homeland Security to study the incel subculture, explained why the incel ideology equates to terrorism: "the fact that incels are aspiring to change things up in a bigger, broader ideological sense, that's, for me, what make it a classic example of terrorism. That's not saying all incels are terrorists. But violent incel activity is, unquestionably, terrorism in my view". In February 2020, an attack in Toronto that was allegedly motivated by incel ideologies became the first such act of violence to be prosecuted as terrorism, and the Royal Canadian Mounted Police stated that they consider the incel subculture to be an "Ideologically Motivated Violent Extremist (IMVE)" movement. Jacob Ware publishing in Counter Terrorist Trends and Analyses wrote that analysis of incels has been focused within the United States and Canada due to the concentration of incel-motivated attacks in those countries. The United States Secret Service National Threat Assessment Center, in a March 2022 case study titled "Hot Yoga Tallahassee: A Case Study of Misogynistic Extremism", sought to draw attention to "the specific threat posed by misogynist extremism."

Connection to suicide forums

In December 2021, the New York Times reported that it had identified 45 people, individually, who died in connection to a website called Sanctioned Suicide, and estimated that the true number was likely much higher. The Times reporters discovered that  Diego Joaquín Galante and Lamarcus Small created and operated the suicide website, in addition to their several incel forums. The CCDH reported that in addition to operating the largest incel forum as of September 2022, Galante and Small also maintained forums for online communities dedicated to body image and unemployment.

Ideology present in incel communities 
Many incel communities are characterized by resentment and hatred, self-pity, racism, misogyny, misanthropy, and narcissism. Discussions often revolve around the belief that men are entitled to sex; other common topics include idleness, loneliness, unhappiness, suicide, sexual surrogates, and prostitutes, as well as attributes they believe increase one's desirability as a partner such as income or personality. Many incels adopt the "scientific blackpill", a series of social psychology studies that purpots to scientifically prove their victimization. Opposition to feminism and women's rights is common, and some posters blame women's liberation for their inability to find a partner. Some incels believe there was a golden age in which couples married early, were strictly monogamous, and adhered to traditional gender roles. They believe that during this time, looks played less of a role in romantic pairings and men's "entitlement" to sex with women was never denied. While incels who hold this belief often disagree about precisely when this golden age occurred, they concur that it was gradually destroyed by feminism, the sexual revolution, women's liberation, and technological progress. Antisemitic beliefs are also regularly found on incel forums, with some posters going so far as to blame the rise of feminism on a plot masterminded by Jews to weaken the Western world.

Much of the knowledge of incel ideology has been derived from observational analysis of online forums which may not represent all or even most incels. There is a question around which posts should be considered and filtering based on popularity and effect compounded by prevalence of deliberately posting for controversy. Some researchers have tried selecting posts for a period of time rather than based on popularity. The attitudes of those who post in forums and those read but do not participate can be different. In in-person interviews with a female interviewer, incels were found to be more interesting in discussing thing lived experiences than discussion anti-feminist ideology.

In context of related communities 

Incel communities are a part of the broader manosphere, a loose collection of misogynist movements that also includes men's rights activists(MRAs), Men Going Their Own Way(MGTOW), pickup artists(PUAs), and fathers' rights groups. Journalists for the New York Times in 2018 wrote that involuntary celibacy is an adaptation of the idea of "male supremacy" and that the communities have evolved into a movement "made up of people—some celibate, some not—who believe that women should be treated as sexual objects with few rights". The Southern Poverty Law Center (SPLC) also described the subculture as "part of the online male supremacist ecosystem", which they began including in their list of hate groups in 2018. While incels believe that they are physically inferior to the rest of society, often referring to themselves as "subhuman", researchers have agreed that incels also espouse supremacist views: either that they are superior to women, or superior to non-incels in general. A 2019 study published in Terrorism and Political Violence found that incels believe themselves to be the only ones who are "capable of pro-social values and intelligent enough ('high IQ') to see the truth about the social world". The study determined that incels followed a pattern that is typical of extremist groups: ascribing highly negative values to out-groups and positive values to in-groups, with the unusual caveat that despite seeing themselves as psychologically superior, incels also view themselves negatively in terms of physical appearance.

Incel communities sometimes overlap with communities such as Men Going Their Own Way, men's rights activism, people who believe they are experiencing "true forced loneliness" (TFL), and pickup artistry, although at least one incel website has expressed hatred for pickup artistry and accused pickup artists and dating coaches of financially exploiting incels. Incel communities have also been observed to overlap with far-right groups, with the Centre for Analysis of the Radical Right noting that incels "are part of a growing trend of radical-right movements" that are distressed by neoliberalism, especially women's empowerment and immigration. Hoffman and colleagues, publishing in Studies in Conflict & Terrorism, stated that "a particularly worrisome trend is how seamlessly the militant incel community has been integrated into the alt-right tapestry, with common grievances and intermingling membership bringing the two extremisms closer together". Der Spiegel reported in March 2021 on the overlap between the incel community and the Feuerkrieg Division, a group modeled after the Atomwaffen Division, a neo-Nazi terrorist network.

Promotion of violence 
Some discussions in incel communities endorse violence against sexually active women and more sexually successful men; harassment of women, including activities such as catfishing; and suicide among incels. According to the Anti-Defamation League, incels are the most violent community within the manosphere. In some incel communities, it is common for posts to glorify violence by self-identified incels such as Elliot Rodger (perpetrator of the 2014 Isla Vista killings) and Alek Minassian (perpetrator of the 2018 Toronto van attack), as well as by those they believe shared their ideology such as Marc Lépine (perpetrator of the 1989 École Polytechnique massacre), Seung-Hui Cho (perpetrator of the 2007 Virginia Tech shooting), and George Sodini (perpetrator of the 2009 Collier Township shooting). Rodger is the most frequently referenced, with incels often referring to him as their "saint" and sharing memes in which his face has been superimposed onto paintings of Christian icons. Some incels consider him to be the true progenitor of today's online incel communities.

Some incels view violence as the only solution to what they see as societal oppression and abuse against them, and speak frequently of incel "uprisings" and "revolts". Other incels take the more nihilistic view that nothing will change society, even violent acts, and focus their efforts on constructing a scientific justification for this nihilism Some incels support the idea of violence as revenge on society, without the hope it will lead to societal change. Some violent posts may be motivated by status seeking behavior by individuals on forums, rather than a desire to promote violence. A 2021 study found that the overwhelming majority of incels themselves do not think that incel groups promote violence.

A subgroup of incels who frequent websites run by Nathan Larson, a perennial political candidate and active participant in incel communities, work deliberately to convince other incels that they are justified in raping women if they are rejected sexually. Some incels describe women's sexual rejection of them as "reverse rape", a phenomenon they consider to be equally harmful as rape.

A September 2022 report by the Center for Countering Digital Hate on the largest dedicated incel forum found that users posted about rape once every 29 minutes during their study period, and used the word "kill" 1,181 times in one month. 89% of forum users during the study period expressed that they support rape in general. According to the report, some posters on the forum try to normalize the idea of child rape, and more than half the total forum during their study period supported pedophilia. The report also exposed that the incel forum site operators had changed a forum rule in March 2022 to allow for the sexualization of pubescent minors, narrowing an existing rule to outlaw only the sexualization of "pre-pubescent" minors.

Justifications for beliefs 

Many incels justify their prejudices using interpretations taken from concepts such as biological determinism and evolutionary psychology. Incels also regularly endorse the ideas of "female hypergamy"; genetic superiority of men over women; the "80/20 rule" (an application of the Pareto principle) which suggests that 80% of women desire the top 20% of most attractive men; and, among non-white incels, the "just be white" (JBW) theory, which suggests that Caucasians face the fewest obstacles to relationships and sex. Incels also believe that people seeking a romantic or sexual partner participate in a cruel, mercenary, and Darwinian sexual selection, wherein incels are genetically unfit and where women hold an advantage for reasons ranging from feminism to the use of cosmetics. Incels may attribute their lack of sexual success to factors such as shyness, sex-segregated work environments, negative body image, penis size, or their physical appearance, and commonly believe that the only thing more important than looks in improving a man's eligibility as a prospective partner is wealth. Some incels justify their beliefs based on the works of fringe social psychologist Brian Gilmartin and clinical psychologist Jordan Peterson.

"Red pill" and "black pill" 

The idea of the "red pill" is an allusion that is common among manosphere communities, as well as some communities outside of the manosphere. It originates from the dilemma in the movie The Matrix where the protagonist must choose whether to remain in a world of illusion (taking the blue pill) or to see the world as it really is (taking the red pill). Among communities that use the term, the "red pill" often refers to the core set of beliefs of that community, and people who are "redpilled" or who have "taken the red pill" are those who hold those beliefs. In manosphere communities such as men's rights groups and, according to some researchers, in incel communities as well, "taking the red pill" means seeing a world where feminism has given women too much power over men and male privilege does not exist. The "black pill" is an extension of the red and blue pill analogy. There is some disagreement among researchers and journalists over which beliefs are "red pill" and which are "black pill", and whether the black pill ideology is a distinguishing belief of incels or if there are incels who do not subscribe to black pill ideas. Some researchers and journalists use the term "red pill" to refer to the set of beliefs commonly held by men's rights' activists, and the term "black pill" to summarize the incel ideology as a whole. Hoffman et al. have said that Taking the black pill' is critical to the incel identity, since it means recognizing 'inceldom' as a permanent condition". Aja Romano writing for Vox has said, "what unites all incels is something known as the black pill". However, researchers at the Anti-Defamation League write that there are some incels who believe in the red pill and others who believe in the black pill.

The "black pill" generally refers to a set of commonly held beliefs in incel communities, which include biological determinism, fatalism, and defeatism for unattractive people. These beliefs are supported by continued reference on incel forums to scientific studies in fields such as psychology, sociology, and evolutionary biology. Believers are referred to as being "blackpilled". The black pill has been described by Vox correspondent Zack Beauchamp as "a profoundly sexist ideology that... amounts to a fundamental rejection of women's sexual emancipation, labeling women shallow, cruel creatures who will choose only the most attractive men if given the choice". The term was first popularized on the blog Omega Virgin Revolt, where it represented a belief that the entire social system was broken and that one's place in the system was not something any individual could change. An incel who has "taken the black pill" has adopted the belief that they are hopeless, and that their lack of success romantically and sexually is permanent regardless of any changes they might try to make to their physical appearance, personality, or other characteristics.

Researchers at the Anti-Defamation League (ADL) have said that incels can also follow the red pill ideology. Those who believe they can improve their chances with women are adherents to the red pill, whereas only incels who believe they have no power to change their position in society or chances with women are blackpilled. The ADL writes that, among incels, the beliefs summarized as "red pill" center around the idea that feminism has unbalanced society to favor women and give them too much power. Redpilled incels believe they have the opportunity to fight back against this system which disadvantages them, which they do by trying to make themselves more attractive to women. Conversely, blackpilled incels are those who believe they can do nothing to change their situation. The ADL writes, "This is where the incel movement takes on characteristics of a death cult". Those who have taken the black pill are left with few options, says the ADL: giving up on life (referred to by incels as "LDAR", an abbreviation for "lie down and rot"), dying by suicide, or committing mass violence.

On the former incel subreddit /r/braincels, the term "blackpill" was also used as a term for memes (usually images) that users shared to describe their thoughts, many of which criticized women as egocentric, cruel, and shallow.

Lexicology 
The term "involuntary celibate" (shortened to "incel") refers to self-identifying members of an online subculture based around the inability to find a romantic or sexual partner despite desiring one, a state they describe as "inceldom" or "incelibacy". It is sometimes used interchangeably or alongside other terms, such as "love-shy" (describing those with social anxiety or excessive shyness preventing romantic success), "FA" (short for "forever alone"), "unfuckability", "omegas", "betas", "betafags", "the undersexed", or "the sexless". Alana, the coiner of the term "incel", initially considered using other terms such as "perpetually single" or "dating shy".

Media scholar Debbie Ging writes that incels' discourse around "victimhood and aggrieved entitlement" began on 4chan and has spread into more mainstream groups such as men's rights activists (MRAs) and Men Going Their Own Way (MGTOW). Members of incel communities regularly use jargon and a distinct dialect. Incels often use dehumanizing and vulgar terms for women, such as "femoids" (which they sometimes shorten to "foids") and "roasties" (a reference to the labia minora, which incels falsely believe changes shape and begins to resemble sliced roast beef after a woman becomes sexually active). Incels refer to attractive sexually active women as "stacys", less attractive sexually active women as "beckys", and attractive sexually active men as "chads". People who are average looking and not incels are "normies". "Mogging" refers to the act of eclipsing another person in terms of physical appearance and thereby undermining them. "Looksmaxing" is an attempt at enhancing one's appearance by methods including getting a haircut and dressing nicely, taking steroids and working out, undergoing plastic surgery, or appealing to alternative techniques such as mewing. The abbreviation "NEET" refers to people who do not have jobs and are not attending school: "not in education, employment, or training".

Members of incel communities use many variations of the term "incel" to refer to subgroups within the community, such as "volcels" (voluntary celibate; someone who chooses to forego sexual intercourse), "fakecels" (those who claim to be incel, but in reality have recently had sex or been in a relationship), and "truecels" (true incels; men who have never had any sexual or romantic encounters). There are also a number of race-based variations of the term "incel" which refer to people who believe their race is the reason behind their inability to find a partner, including "currycels" (people of South Asian ancestry) and "ricecels" (those of Chinese or Southeast Asian backgrounds), or collectively, "ethnicels".

Demographics 
Incels are mostly male and heterosexual, and are often described as young and friendless introverts. Estimates of the size of incel communities during 2018-2019 varied, and ranged from the thousands, to tens of thousands, to hundreds of thousands. More recently, a statistical analysis of the largest incel forum shows that only a few hundred accounts made up the vast majority of forum posts during all of 2021 and most of 2022. Some media outlets depict incels as unemployed or NEET ("not in education, employment, or training") and living with parents.

Many sources describe incels as predominantly white. Sociologist Ross Haenfler was quoted in The Washington Post describing them as primarily white. Heidi Beirich of the Southern Poverty Law Center echoed this to NBC News, saying they are "young, frustrated white males in their late teens into their early twenties who are having a hard time adjusting to adulthood". Jaki and colleagues, publishing linguistic analysis of a large incel forum in The Journal of Language Aggression and Conflict in June 2019, contended that "contrary to what is often reported" there was no definitive evidence that the group is predominantly white, and that "it is impossible to say whether the majority of... users are white men, but our data implies that this may be less true than expected. They suggested that the various mentions of race on the forum "may reflect, to some extent, the ethnic variety of the forum". However, Hoffman and colleagues, publishing in Studies in Conflict & Terrorism, reported that a March 2020 survey of the same forum determined that most respondents self-identified as Caucasian. Researchers from the University of Texas ran a poll of self-reported incels, which found that 63.58% of those who responded identified as white, a smaller percentage than non-incels in the study. They also found that 44.70% of incels who responded leaned to the left on the political spectrum, 17.47% were centrists, and 38.85% leaned to the right, showing no differences between the incel and the control group of the study.

Incels are mainly located in North America and Europe, although there are also incel communities for people outside the Anglosphere, such as the Italian website Il Forum dei Brutti. The English language forums also receive much traffic from non-anglophone countries. Research published in 2020 by the Swedish Defence Research Agency (FOI) on the three largest incel forums found they had a total of about 20,000 users, with only about 1,000 who post actively. The FOI found that between 4.6 and 7.3% of the visitors to the forums originated from Sweden, though they caution this may not be accurate given the use of personal VPNs.

Female incels 
The first incel website, Alana's Involuntary Celibacy Project, was gender-inclusive. There have been more contemporary female-specific incel communities, such as r/TruFemcels and its successor ThePinkPill. Tens of thousands of self-identifying female incels, also called femcels, are reported to populate the internet. Nonetheless, there is disagreement in online incel communities on whether women can be incels, with some claiming that male incels grossly outnumber female incels, others claiming that it is impossible for women to be an incel at all, others claiming that only women with a physical deformity can be incels, and others arguing that only unattractive women belonging to the "bottom percentile in terms of appearance" can be incels. According to the Anti-Defamation League, the majority of incels do not believe women can be incels. M. Kelly wrote for the Political Research Associates in 2021 that incels point to the existence of female incels as an argument against criticisms of the communities as misogynist, but that most incel communities don't accept them and ban them from using their forums.

, the most popular femcel forum was the r/TruFemcels subreddit, with over 22,000 members. It was banned in January 2021 for violating Reddit's rules against promoting hate. Another subreddit reportedly associated with femcels is r/Vindicta, which contains beauty advice. Journalists have written that outside of the female incels' own communities, few believe women can genuinely experience involuntary celibacy. Some female incels believe they could have casual sex, but fear it would only be from men who would abuse or disrespect them. Within online femcel communities, misogyny and an impossible feminine beauty ideal are also perceived as reasons for female celibacy. Many other women have similar problems, but do not self-identify as femcels.

Some have been critical of body positivity and mainstream feminism, viewing them as unhelpful to femcels: a former member of the r/TruFemcels community was quoted in The Atlantic saying, "I'd rather be able to talk about being ugly than just try to convince myself that I'm pretty". An expert in psychology interviewed by El País characterized these communities as overly insular and skeptical of outsiders (who are deemed "normies"), in what she described as "cognitive inflexibility". She also stated that, "US culture is less sociable. In Spain, [femcels] would have completely different characteristics... I don't think it would have the same number of followers, to begin with, because in Spain we are more encouraging of interpersonal relationships, and the development of social skills."

Women who identify as incels share some similarities with their male counterparts, such as belief that physical appearance is the most important factor in finding a partner. In other ways they tend to be different; for example, according to journalist Isabelle Kohn, rather than being angry at the men who reject them, they empathize with the men for not wanting to date them. Kohn notes the tendency for female incels to turn their rage inwards, rather than outwards like males. Journalist Arwa Mahdawi hypothesizes that the fact female incels do not go on violent rampages like some male incels is the most obvious reason why female incels have not received much attention in mainstream media. In February 2020, Kohn wrote that she could find "mountains" of academic papers on male incels, but none on female incels. She says the assumption that female incels do not exist adds to their pain.

Mental health 

"Involuntary celibacy" is not a medical or psychological condition. Some people who identify as incel have physical disabilities or psychological disorders such as depression, anxiety, autism, and body dysmorphic disorder. A 2022 study found that self-identified incels had higher rates of depression, anxiety, and formal mental diagnoses than the general population: 95% reported depression and 93% reported anxiety. 38% had clinical diagnoses.

Some visitors of incel forums attribute their inability to find a partner to physical or mental ailments, while some others attribute it to extreme introversion. Many incels engage in self-diagnosis of mental health issues, and members of incel communities often discourage posters who post about mental illness from seeing therapists or otherwise seeking treatment. Some incels with severe depression are also suicidal, and some members of incel communities encourage suicidal members to kill themselves, sometimes recommending they commit acts of mass violence before doing so.

Mass murders and violence 

Mass murders and other violent attacks have been committed or are suspected to have been committed by men who have self-identified as involuntarily celibate, or whose statements align with incel ideologies. Other intended attacks by such individuals have been thwarted by police before being carried out.

2000s 

On August 4, 2009, George Sodini opened fire at an LA Fitness health club in Collier Township, a suburb of Pittsburgh, Pennsylvania. Three women were murdered and nine other people were injured before Sodini killed himself. He purportedly expressed sexual frustration and complained of constant rejections by women on a website registered in his name. Sodini and his actions have been embraced and glorified by some members of incel communities, who sometimes refer to incel violence as "going Sodini".

2010s 

Elliot Rodger killed six people and injured fourteen others before killing himself in Isla Vista, California on May 23, 2014, near the campus of University of California, Santa Barbara. These killings drew media attention to the concept of involuntary celibacy, and particularly the misogyny and glorification of violence that are a mainstay of many incel communities. Rodger self-identified as an incel and left behind a 137-page manifesto and YouTube videos in which he detailed his involuntary celibacy and discussed how he wanted revenge for being rejected by women. He had been an active member of a community popular among incels called PUAHate (short for "pickup artist hate"), and referenced it several times in his manifesto. Although PUAHate shut down soon after the attack, Rodger became something of a martyr to some communities that remained, and to some of those that emerged later. It is common to see references to "E.R." in incel forums, and mass violence by incels is regularly referred to as "going E.R.". Rodger has been referenced by the perpetrators or suspected perpetrators of several other mass killings, and is one of several attackers who are regularly praised by members of incel communities.

Chris Harper-Mercer killed nine people and injured eight others before killing himself in a shooting at the Umpqua Community College campus on October 1, 2015, in Roseburg, Oregon. He left a manifesto at the scene, outlining his interest in other mass murders including the Isla Vista killings, his anger at not having a girlfriend, and his animus towards the world. In his journal writings, he had related with Elliot Rodger and other mass shooters, describing them as "people who stand with the gods". Before the attack, when someone on an online message board had speculated Harper-Mercer was "saving himself for someone special", Harper-Mercer had replied: 'involuntarily so". Several hours before the shooting, someone suspected to be Harper-Mercer posted a threat to a Pacific Northwest college to /r9k/, a 4chan board with many incel posters.

On July 31, 2016, Sheldon Bentley robbed and killed an unconscious man in an alleyway in Edmonton, Alberta. During his trial, Bentley said he killed the man by stomping on his abdomen because he was frustrated with stress from his job as a security guard and with being an incel for four years.

William Atchison killed two people before killing himself on December 7, 2017, in Aztec, New Mexico, in a shooting at Aztec High School, where he had previously been a student. He had used the pseudonym "Elliot Rodger" on several online forums, and praised "the supreme gentleman" (a term Rodger had used to describe himself, which has since become a common reference among incel communities). Atchison had also posted far-right content online.

Nikolas Cruz killed seventeen people and injured seventeen others on February 14, 2018, in a shooting at Stoneman Douglas High School in Parkland, Florida. Allegedly also motivated by other extremist views, Cruz had previously posted online that "Elliot Rodger will not be forgotten".

After an April 23, 2018 vehicle-ramming attack in Toronto, Ontario, Alek Minassian was convicted of 10 counts of first-degree murder and 16 counts of attempted murder. Shortly before the attack, Minassian had allegedly posted on Facebook that "the Incel Rebellion has already begun" and applauded Rodger. The term "Incel Rebellion" is sometimes used interchangeably with the term "Beta Uprising", which refers to a violent response to incels' perceived sexual deprivation. Following the attack, a poster on a website created to supersede /r/incels wrote about Minassian, "I hope this guy wrote a manifesto because he could be our next new saint". Following the attack, police claimed that Minassian had been radicalized by incel communities. A video interview was later released in  showing Minassian being interrogated by police shortly after the attacks. In the video, Minassian is shown telling police that he was a virgin, and that he was motivated by a resentment of "Chads and Staceys", as well as women who gave "their love and affection to obnoxious brutes" rather than to him. The video also showed Minassian saying that he hoped the alleged attack would "inspire future masses to join me" in committing acts of violence as a part of the "Beta Uprising". The judge who found Minassian guilty on all counts wrote in her decision that Minassian had attempted to tie his attack to the incel community as a way of increasing his notoriety, and that "working out his exact motivation for this attack is... close to impossible". She found that Minassian had "lie[d] to the police about much of the incel motivation he talked about and that the incel movement was not in fact a primary driving force behind the attack".

On November 2, 2018, Scott Beierle killed two women and injured four women and a man before killing himself in a shooting at the Hot Yoga Tallahassee studio in Tallahassee, Florida. He had been a follower of incel ideologies for a long time, and also had a history of arrests for grabbing women's buttocks. In 2014 he posted several YouTube videos of himself espousing extreme hatred for women and expressing anger over not having a girlfriend, mentioning Elliot Rodger in one video. In the months leading up to the shooting, he posted numerous misogynistic, racist, violent, and homophobic songs to SoundCloud.

In January 2019, Christopher Cleary was arrested for posting on Facebook that he was "planning on shooting up a public place soon and being the next mass shooter" and "killing as many girls as I see" because he had never had a girlfriend and was a virgin. He has been described as an incel in the media. In May 2019, Cleary was sentenced to up to five years in prison for an attempted threat of terrorism.

Brian Isaack Clyde began what was intended to be a mass shooting at the Earle Cabell Federal Building and Courthouse in Dallas, Texas on June 17, 2019, but was shot and fatally wounded by officers from the Federal Protective Service before he injured anyone. Clyde had shared incel memes on social media, along with other posts referencing right-wing beliefs and conspiracy theories. Following the incident, the Joint Base Andrews military base briefed its personnel on incels, with a spokesman describing them as "a very real threat to military members and civilians".

Incels have also praised attackers with unclear motives who they believe to be incels. After the 2017 Las Vegas shooting, some of the incel community celebrated the shooter Stephen Paddock, who they felt was a hero who was targeting "normies". After the 2018 Toronto shooting, posters on an incel message board expressed excitement with the possibility that the perpetrator might be an incel, although no motive was identified.

2020s 
Tobias Rathjen committed two mass shootings in Hanau, Germany on February 19, 2020, killing ten people and himself, and leaving behind a manifesto described by Insider as "delusional". Some media sources described Rathjen as an incel, though fellows at the International Centre for Counter-Terrorism wrote that while the manifesto was "riddled with misogynistic remarks", some of which were similar to common incel topics, "the manifesto does not demonstrate a clear connection to the incel identity, either in terms of evidence that the shooter frequented incel forums or shared basic incel ideology". The manifesto also included racist and paranoid writings, where Rathjen called for the extermination of non-white people and claimed he had not had a relationship with a woman because the government had been monitoring him.

On February 24, 2020, a female spa worker was stabbed to death in an attack that also severely injured her female coworker at an erotic massage parlor in Toronto. On May 19, the Toronto Police Service declared the attack was being treated as a terrorist incident after evidence pointed to the stabbings being motivated by incel ideology, and police laid charges against a 17-year-old male alleged to have committed the stabbings. This was the first time violence thought to be motivated by incel ideologies was prosecuted as an act of terrorism, and is also believed to be the first act of violence not perpetrated by an Islamist extremist to be prosecuted as terrorism in Canada.

Armando Hernandez Jr. opened fire on May 20, 2020, at Westgate Entertainment District, a mixed-use development in Glendale, Arizona, before being arrested by police. A 19-year-old man was critically injured, while a 30-year-old woman and a 16-year-old girl suffered minor injuries. According to the Maricopa County prosecutor, Hernandez identified himself as an incel and claimed he wanted to target couples and shoot at least ten people. The prosecutor said, "Mr. Hernandez is a self-professed incel... He was taking out his anger at society, the feeling that he has been bullied, the feeling that women didn't want him". The prosecutor also alleged that Hernandez sent a video of the attack to a woman he wished to impress.

Among them was Cole Carini, a man who was charged with making false statements to law enforcement in June 2020 after claiming serious injuries to his hands had been caused by a lawnmower accident. Police alleged that Carini was actually injured while trying to make a bomb, and that he had written a note threatening violence against women and referencing Elliot Rodger.

In April 2021, a 19-year-old self-described incel was arrested on federal charges after allegedly videotaping himself approaching women sitting outside a restaurant in Manhattan, New York and telling them he was going to detonate a bomb. The man had previously been arrested several times for harassing others, often while recording or livestreaming, and for multiple assaults with pepper spray.

In July 2021, a 21-year-old self-identified incel from Ohio was charged with attempting a hate crime and illegally possessing a machine gun. The man was a frequent poster on a popular incel website, where he wrote posts venerating Elliot Rodger. He wrote a manifesto in which he expressed his desire to "slaughter" women, and in another document he allegedly wrote about his goals to kill 3,000 people in a mass casualty attack.

Criticism

Of incels 

Incel communities have been criticized in the media and by researchers as violent, misogynist, and extremist. Keegan Hankes, a senior research analyst working for the Southern Poverty Law Center, has cautioned that exposure to violent content on incel forums "play[s] a very large role" in the radicalization of incels, and describes incel forums as having "more violent rhetoric than I'm used to seeing on even white supremacist sites". Journalist David Futrelle has described incel communities as "violently misogynistic", and is among critics who attribute worsening violent rhetoric on incel forums to the growth of the alt-right and white supremacy, and the overlap between incel communities and online hate groups. Psychologist and sex researcher James Cantor has described incels as "a group of people who usually lack sufficient social skills and... find themselves very frustrated". He has said that in incel forums "when they're surrounded by other people with similar frustrations, they kind of lose track of what typical discourse is, and they drive themselves into more and more extreme beliefs". Senior research fellow at the Institute for Strategic Dialogue(ISD), Amarnath Amarasingam, has criticized some incel communities where calls for violence are commonplace, saying "under the right set of psychological and personal circumstances, these kinds of forums can be dangerous and push people into violence". Another researcher at the ISD, Jacob Davey, compared the radicalization of incels in incel forums to teenagers being urged to go to extreme measures on online forums that promote anorexia and other eating disorders, and to online campaigns convincing people to join ISIL. Speaking about incels' feelings of entitlement to sex, Davey said the attitude "can go as far as the justification of rape".

While generally agreeing with critics' concerns about misogyny and other negative characteristics in the incel subculture, some commentators have been more sympathetic towards incels. In April 2018, economist Robin Hanson wrote a blog post likening access to sex with access to income, writing that he found it puzzling that similar concern had not been shown to incels as to low income individuals. Hanson was criticized by some for discussing sex as if it was a commodity; others wrote more positively about his opinions. New York Times columnist Ross Douthat wrote a similarly controversial op-ed in May 2018 titled "The Redistribution of Sex" in which he suggested sex robots and sex workers would inevitably be called upon to satisfy incels' sexual desires. Some commentators wrote articles agreeing with this view, including Toby Young, who agreed that sex robots could be a "workable solution"; others criticized the column for objectifying women and for legitimizing the incel ideology.

Journalist Zack Beauchamp has expressed concern about other types of harm inflicted by incels that may be lost in the attention paid specifically to mass violence; he points to forum posts in which users brag about yelling at, catfishing, and sexually assaulting women. University of Portsmouth lecturer Lisa Sugiura has described incel forums as a "networked misogyny", and urged the posts in such forums be taken seriously not only in the context of hate speech but also as a form of grooming that could radicalize "impressionable and vulnerable disillusioned young men". Some sociological research on incel communities has analyzed them as a hybrid masculinity, in which privileged men distance themselves from hegemonic masculinity while simultaneously reproducing it.

Of platforms providing services to incel communities 

Criticism has also been directed against platforms that host or have hosted incel content, including Reddit (which banned the /r/incels community in 2017, and banned most of the remaining incel communities in September 2019, but is still home to some incels) and Twitter. Cloudflare, which provides services including DDoS protection, caching and obsfucation of the source host of the content, has also been criticized for protecting incel websites against downtime even when webhosts have terminated service.

Of reporting and research on incels 

Reporting on incels by media outlets following the incel-related attacks during the 2010s has been criticized for its "breathless" coverage, for normalizing incel communities by describing them only as "sexually frustrated", and for directing readers to incel communities. Some reporting has also been criticized for giving attackers notoriety by reporting on them at length, or for victim blaming by implying that women who had rejected the attackers' romantic or sexual advances held some responsibility for provoking the attacks. Those who have written sympathetically about incels have faced criticism for legitimizing the incel ideology, such as from Samantha Cole in Vice who condemned media outlets who "cove[r] and amplif[y] toxic internet culture as if it's valid ideology".

In a 2021 report published by the Political Research Associates think tank, M. Kelly wrote about recent attempts by various incels to "rebrand" their communities, and stated that "incels' attempts to reframe their identity have also been helped along by researchers, journalists, and 'counter-violent extremism' experts, who, in their attempts to investigate and understand incels, have given them larger, more mainstream platforms. These new platforms have allowed incels to reframe the public narrative about them; minimize the threat their community poses; and have amplified—or even endorsed—their hate-laced grievances, centering their self-perceived victimhood at the hands of women who deny them sex". Kelly criticized a podcast titled The Incel Project for platforming incel ideologies without challenging or fact-checking their statements, and its creator, Naama Kates, for increasingly "no longer just reporting on incels' misogyny, but justifying and sharing it with the world". Kelly also criticized the International Center for Study of Violent Extremism (ICSVE), who published several reports on incels co-authored by Kates and by the founder and lead moderator of a major incel forum, writing that "while previous ICSVE reports have drawn from primary data, including interviews and surveys with members of the community being studied, this seems to be the first time—at ICSVE or in academic research more broadly—that someone actively involved in a community that regularly expresses bigoted or violent ideology has co-authored the resulting study".

Portrayals in fiction 

Two episodes of the American crime drama Law & Order: Special Victims Unit are based on incels. In season 16, the episode "Holden's Manifesto" is based on Elliot Rodger and the 2014 Isla Vista killings. In season 20, the episode "Revenge" features a group of incels who attack the targets of each other's obsession to exact revenge while creating alibis for one another, the plotline which in itself is inspired by a 1950s novel Strangers On A Train.

Fair Warning, a 2020 thriller novel by Michael Connelly, features a company that buys genetic test data on women genetically identified as vulnerable to sex addiction. The company sells their names and addresses to incels, one of whom is a serial killer.

The main character of Whatever, a 1994 novel by French author Michel Houellebecq, has been labeled by Adam Kirsch of The New York Times as a "proto-incel" with the novel as a whole being retrospectively evaluated as predictive of the modern incel movement. It was adapted into a film of the same name in 1999.

See also 

 Herbivore men
 Hikikomori
 Human mating strategies
 List of subcultures
 Lookism
 Mate value
 Nice guys
 Jack Richard Peterson
 Sexual capital
 Toxic masculinity

References

External links 

  Podcast episode about the early history of the incel subculture.

1990s neologisms
2010s controversies
2020s controversies
Celibacy
Culture-related controversies
Gender-related violence
Internet memes
Internet-related controversies
Manosphere
Misogyny
Opposition to feminism
/pol/ phenomena
Social issues
Social psychology
Subcultures
Sexual controversies